Ding Dang may refer to:

Ding Dang (singer) (born 1982), Chinese singer
"Ding Dang" (song), 1977 song by The Beach Boys
Ding Dang (fictional character), character in Ode to Gallantry

See also 
 Ding Dong (disambiguation)
 Đồng Đăng, a border town in Vietnam